Camillo Guerra (Naples 21 May 1797 – 10 March 1874 Naples) was an Italian painter, active mainly in Naples, Italy.

Biography
Born to a family of artists; his father, however, led a crew performing excavations at Pompei. Initially his father had wanted his son to become a lawyer, but Camillo became a student at the Royal School of Art under Costanzo Angelini .

In 1822, he won a prize that led him to a scholarship in Rome under Tommaso Conca, then under Vincenzo Camuccini. He was also influenced by Pietro Benvenuti and the reigning Neoclassicism. In 1829, he collaborated with E. Pistolesi in an eight-volume illustrated book about artifacts in the Vatican.

In 1827, he was nominated honorary professor of the Royal Institute of Art. In 1830, he was one of the artists that was commissioned to paint for the church of San Francesco di Paola. This neoclassic style church was meant by Francis I of the Two Sicilies to celebrate the restitution of the Bourbon dynasty and the expulsion of the Napoleonic Republic. Camillo's contribution was an altarpiece depicting Glory of St Joseph (finished 1834). In 1834, he became professor at the Royal Academy.  He painted a Virgin dei Raggi  (now lost) for the church of San Nicola da Tolentino . For the former painting, he was paid 600 lira, and for the latter 400 lira. He painted an Apparition of the Virgin to Phillip Neri for the church of the Concezione, Naples. In the 1840s, with Gennaro Maldarelli, Filippo Marsigli, and Giuseppe Cammarano, he helped decorate  rooms in the Royal Palace, now of the National Library in Naples (Biblioteca Nazionale Vittorio Emanuele III). Guerra frescoed the four Seasons. From 1846 to 1852, he painted an imposing fresco of the Celestial Paradise, harkening to a vision of St John the Evangelist, in the cupola of the Church of the Gerolomini (partly destroyed in 1943) 

He painted frescoes for the Bourbon dynasty in the palaces of Caserta and the Royal Palace of Naples.  He painted the Miracle of the Fishes for the Cathedral of Caserta and Life of St Paul in the Aversa Cathedral. His nephew, Achille Guerra (Naples 18 June 1832 – 23 January 1903 Rome).

Sources
 Encyclopedia Treccani entry by Maura Picciau.

1797 births
1874 deaths
18th-century Neapolitan people
19th-century Italian painters
Italian male painters
Italian neoclassical painters
Painters from Naples
Fresco painters
19th-century Italian male artists
19th-century Neapolitan people